The 1962 All-Southwest Conference football team consists of American football players chosen by various organizations for All-Southwest Conference teams for the 1962 NCAA University Division football season.  The selectors for the 1962 season included the Associated Press (AP) and the United Press International (UPI).  Players selected as first-team players by both the AP and UPI are designated in bold.

All Southwest selections

Backs
 Billy Moore, Arkansas (AP-1; UPI-1)
 Ronnie Goodwin, Baylor (AP-1; UPI-1)
 Tommy Ford, Texas (AP-1; UPI-1)
 Jesse Branch, Arkansas (UPI-1)
 Danny Brabham, Arkansas (AP-1)

Ends
 Dave Parks, Texas Tech (AP-1; UPI-1)
 Gene Raesz, Rice (AP-1; UPI-1)

Tackles
 Jerry Mazzanti, Arkansas (AP-1; UPI-1)
 Scott Appleton, Texas (UPI-1)
 Ray Schoenke, SMU (AP-1)

Guards
 Johnny Treadwell, Texas (AP-1; UPI-1)
 Ray Trail, Arkansas (UPI-1)
 Robert Burk, Baylor (AP-1)

Centers
 Jerry Hopkins, Texas A&M (AP-1; UPI-1)

Key
AP = Associated Press

UPI = United Press International

Bold = Consensus first-team selection of both the AP and UP

See also
1962 College Football All-America Team

References

All-Southwest Conference
All-Southwest Conference football teams